Islamism in South Asia may refer to:

Muslim nationalism in South Asia
Islamist movements in South Asia
Islamist leadership and organisations in India

Historical events
Muhammad Zia-ul-Haq's Islamization
1984 Pakistani Islamisation programme referendum
Pakistan Movement
Talibanization
International propagation of Salafism and Wahhabism (Taliban in Afghanistan)

See also

:Category:Islamism in India
:Category:Islamism in Pakistan
:Category:Islamism in Bangladesh
:Category:Islamism in Afghanistan
:Category:Indian Islamists
:Category:Pakistani Islamists
:Category:Bangladeshi Islamists
:Category:Islamic terrorism in Pakistan
:Category:Islamic terrorism in Bangladesh
:Category:Islamic terrorism in India
:Category:Jihadist groups in Bangladesh
:Category:Jihadist groups in Afghanistan
:Category:Jihadist groups in India
:Category:Jihadist groups in Pakistan
:Template:Islamism in South Asia
:Template:Militant Islamism in South Asia
Spread of Islam to the Indian subcontinent